Charixena may refer to:

Charixene, an Ancient Greek musician and poet
Charixena iridoxa, a species of moth